Rhenium heptafluoride is the compound with the formula ReF7. It is a yellow low melting solid and is the only thermally stable metal heptafluoride. It has a distorted pentagonal bipyramidal structure similar to IF7, which was confirmed by neutron diffraction at 1.5 K. The structure is non-rigid, as evidenced by electron diffraction studies.

Production, reactions and properties
Rhenium heptafluoride can be prepared from the elements at 400 °C:

2 Re + 7 F2 → 2 ReF7
It also can be produced by the explosion of rhenium metal under sulfur hexafluoride. 

It hydrolyzes under a base to form perrhenic acid and hydrogen fluoride:
ReF7 + 4H2O → HReO4 + 7HF
With fluoride donors such as CsF, the ReF8− anion is formed, which has a square antiprismatic structure. With antimony pentafluoride, SbF5, a fluoride acceptor, the ReF6+ cation  is formed.

References

Rhenium compounds
Fluorides